Lamoria is a genus of small moths belonging to the family Pyralidae.

Description
The palpi of the male are minute, whereas those of the female project about the length of head and are downcurved at their extremity. Maxillary palpi filiform. Frons with a conical tuft. Antennae simple. Forewings of male with a large glandular swelling at base of costa below. Vein 3 from before angle of cell. Veins 4 and 5 from angle, which is much produced. Veins 8 and 9 stalked from vein 7. Veins 10 and 11 free. Female with vein 3 from angle of cell, which is not produced. Veins 4 and 5 stalked. Hindwings with open cell. Veins 2, 3, 4 and 5 at regular intervals. Vein 7 anastomosing (fusing) with vein 8.

Species

 Lamoria adaptella (Walker, 1863)
 Lamoria anella (Denis & Schiffermüller, 1775)
 Lamoria attamasca Whalley, 1964
 Lamoria baea (West, 1931)
 Lamoria brevinaevella Zerny, 1934
 Lamoria cafrella (Ragonot, 1888)
 Lamoria clathrella (Ragonot, 1888)
 Lamoria eumeces (Turner, 1913)
 Lamoria exiguata Whalley, 1964
 Lamoria fumidea Whalley, 1964
 Lamoria glaucalis Caradja, 1925
 Lamoria hemi Rose, 1981
 Lamoria idiolepida Turner, 1922
 Lamoria imbella (Walker, 1864)
 Lamoria infumatella Hampson, 1898
 Lamoria inostentalis (Walker, 1863)
 Lamoria jordanis Ragonot, 1901
 Lamoria medianalis Hampson, 1917
 Lamoria melanophlebia Ragonot, 1888
 Lamoria oenochroa (Turner, 1905)
 Lamoria pachylepidella Hampson, 1901
 Lamoria pallens Whalley, 1964
 Lamoria ruficostella Ragonot, 1888
 Lamoria surrufa Whalley, 1964
 Lamoria virescens Hampson, 1898

The former L. rufivena is now Tirathaba rufivena.

References

External links
 
 

Tirathabini
Pyralidae genera
Taxa named by Francis Walker (entomologist)